Palicella is a genus of crustose lichens in the family Lecanoraceae. It contains six species.

Taxonomy
The genus was circumscribed in 2014 by lichenologists Pamela Rodriguez-De Flakus and Christian Printzen to accommodate the type species, Palicella glaucopa (formerly placed in the genus Lecidea), and two closely related species, P. filamentosa and P. schizochromatica. Molecular analyses of these lichens revealed a monophyletic clade that is sister to representatives from two Lecanoraceae genera, Lecanora symmicta and Pyrrhospora quernea. Two additional species were transferred to Palicella from Lecanora in 2019.

Description
Palicella species have biatorine apothecia, which are often darkened (by the pigment cinereorufa-green), an exciple (a saucer-shaped rim around the hymenium) consisting of radiating, narrow hyphae with elongated lumina, and a hymenium with branched and sparsely anastomosed paraphyses. Other microscopic characteristics include an ascus with a broad axial body surrounded by a distinct darker staining layer, and ascospores with a narrow ellipsoid shape.

Species
, Species Fungorum (as listed in the Catalogue of Life) accepts six species in Palicella:
Palicella anakeestiicola 
Palicella filamentosa  
Palicella glaucopa  
Palicella lueckingii  

Palicella schizochromatica  
Palicella xantholeuca

References

Lecanoraceae
Lichen genera
Lecanorales genera
Taxa described in 2014